Meon Valley is a parliamentary constituency in Hampshire represented in the House of Commons of the UK Parliament by Flick Drummond, a Conservative, since 2019. It had previously been represented since its 2010 creation by George Hollingbery.

Constituency profile
It is a generally rural constituency, and an affluent safe seat for the Conservatives. The largest towns in the constituency are Waterlooville and Horndean.

Output areas in the area in 2001 displayed higher than average incomes overall compared to the national average.  In the 2011 census, incidence of home ownership and incidence of semi-detached and detached properties all exceeded the national average and were some of the highest figures for the region.

Boundaries

This seat has been formed by the Boundary Commission for England as an extra constituency in Hampshire, with electoral wards from East Hampshire, Havant and Winchester districts.
From East Hampshire - the wards of Clanfield and Finchdean, Horndean Catherington and Lovedean, Horndean Downs, Horndean Hazleton and Blendworth, Horndean Kings, Horndean Murray and Rowlands Castle
From Havant - the wards of Cowplain, Hart Plain and 
From Winchester - the wards of Bishops Waltham, Boarhunt and Southwick, Cheriton and Bishops Sutton, Denmead, Droxford, Soberton and Hambledon, Owslebury and Curdridge, Shedfield, Swanmore and Newtown, Upper Meon Valley, Whiteley and Wickham

The wards included are largely from parts of the former Winchester and East Hampshire parliamentary seats with some 600 voters from the Havant constituency which is otherwise unchanged.

There is a proposal by the Boundary Commission to break up the Meon Valley constituency, with the parliamentary constituencies of Winchester, Fareham and East Hampshire taking over areas of the constituency. The plans will go through Parliament by July 2023.

History
When created, the notional result was based on ward data from the previous seats' general election results. The new constituency takes in territory from the then Liberal Democrat-held Winchester and Conservative-held East Hampshire with uncertain swing between the two parties . Estimates were that the Conservative majority if the seat had existed in 2005 would have been around 2,000 votes. At the 2010 election however, the seat saw one of the largest Liberal Democrat to Conservative swings (9.4%), and the Conservative candidate George Hollingbery was elected with a majority of over 12,000. A similar swing was recorded in the neighbouring Winchester seat, which was a Conservative gain. It would now take a swing of almost 12% for any party to gain Meon Valley and more than 24% swing for Labour.

Following the 2015 general election it is one of the safest Conservative seats in the country.

Members of Parliament

Elections

Elections in the 2010s

See also
List of parliamentary constituencies in Hampshire

Notes

References

Parliamentary constituencies in Hampshire
Constituencies of the Parliament of the United Kingdom established in 2010
Borough of Havant
Politics of Winchester
East Hampshire District